The F. F. Beale House, at 1802 Cleveland Blvd. in Caldwell, Idaho, was built in 1923.  It was listed on the National Register of Historic Places in May 1993.

It is significant for its association with Frederick Fleming Beale (1876-1948), music composer and professor at College of Idaho.  He and his wife Mary lived in the house during 1923 to 1943.

References

External links
 

		
houses completed in 1923
National Register of Historic Places in Canyon County, Idaho